The Super League Greece 2 is the 30 team two-group second division of professional football in Greece, being a feeder-league to the top-level Super League usually played from September to May.

History
The league was founded in 2019, after the restructuring of the Greek football league championships, replacing the Football League (former Beta Ethniki) as the second level in the league pyramid.

Twelve (12) clubs participated in the league's first season and second season of operation. 

For the third season (2021-2022) the league was restructured into a two-group league with thirty-four (34) clubs after the abolition of the third level Football League.

Teams

North Group

South Group

Results

From 2019 to Present

See also
Greek football league system
Greek Cup

References

External links
Official website 

 
2
Greece
Professional sports leagues in Greece